Greererpeton burkemorani ("crawler from Greer, West Virginia") is an extinct genus of colosteid stem-tetrapods from the Early Carboniferous period (late Viséan) of North America. Greererpeton was first described by famed vertebrate paleontologist Alfred S. Romer in 1969. The skull was redescribed by Timothy R. Smithson in 1982, while postcranial remains were redescribed by Stephen J. Godfrey in 1989.

Greererpeton were probably aquatic, with an elongated body adapted for swimming. The most complete adult specimen only preserved 12 tail vertebrae, only about a third the length of the body as in Andrias. However, smaller specimens have been found preserving over 30 vertebrae, so it is not inconceivable that a complete tail was approximately as long as the body. The limbs were short, though not vestigial; the fingers were still well-developed. Greererpeton were carnivores which probably lived in rivers and swamps.

Paleobiology 
There is a large amount of evidence that Greererpeton and other colosteids were completely aquatic animals. Grooves on the side of the skull indicate that Greererpeton had lateral lines, sensory organs commonly found only in fish and aquatic stem-tetrapods. The stapes bone at the rear of the skull is massive, probably used as a support for the skull. This contrasts with the stapes of terrestrial animals such as frogs, mammals, and lizards. In these groups the bone is thin and sensitive to vibration, so it is used for sensitive hearing. The thick stapes of Greererpeton is an indication that did not have good hearing like terrestrial animals. Greererpeton retains a postbranchial lamina on its shoulder blade, which may have been indicative of internal gills like those of fish. However, the erratic distribution of postbranchial laminae in aquatic and terrestrial fish and amphibians makes this conclusion questionable.

Godfrey (1989) considered Greererpeton to be biologically similar to the modern Asian giant salamanders (Andrias), the largest living amphibians. Preserved Greererpeton skeletons have their bodies lay completely flat, with their tails twisted over to lay flat perpendicular to the body. These preservational quirks may indicate that the body was flattened dorsoventrally (from top-to-bottom), while the tail was flattened mediolaterally (from side-to-side) into a fin-like structure used for swimming. Young Andrias congregate in shallow water while older individuals were bottom-dwelling predators preferring deeper rivers. Given that small Greererpeton skeletons have been found in groups while larger ones are solitary, it is presumable that Greererpeton behaved similarly.

Footnotes

External links 
 Greerpeton & Spathicephalus from Palaeos web
 THE MANDIBLE OF THE PRIMITIVE TETRAPOD GREERERPETON by JOHN R. BOLT and R. ERIC LOMBARD
 Skull fossil

Carboniferous tetrapods of North America
Ichthyostegalia
Taxa named by Alfred Romer
Fossil taxa described in 1969